Liu Bei's takeover of Yi Province was a military campaign by the warlord Liu Bei in taking control of Yi Province (covering present-day Sichuan and Chongqing) from the provincial governor, Liu Zhang. The campaign took place between the years 211 and 214 in the late Eastern Han dynasty; although the conflict between Liu Bei and Liu Zhang started in late 212 when the latter discovered the former secret communications and subsequently executed Zhang Song. It concluded with victory for Liu Bei and his successful takeover of the province from Liu Zhang. Yi Province would serve as the foundation of the state of Shu Han during the Three Kingdoms period.

Background
After the Battle of Red Cliffs, Sun Quan invited Liu Bei to take Yi Province with him, but the latter strongly rebutted the former, saying: "if you're going to conquer the land of Shu, I will loosen my hair and become a hermit in the deep hills. Earth under Heaven can hear my promise, and I'll live up to my words!" Believing Liu Bei, Sun Quan aborted his plan; however, Liu Bei was actually trying to take Yi Province for himself and negotiated Yiling County and Nan Commandery from Sun Quan. In 211, Liu Zhang, the Governor of Yi Province, heard that Cao Cao was planning to attack Zhang Lu in Hanzhong Commandery. As Hanzhong Commandery was a strategic location and the "gateway" into Yi Province, Liu Zhang sent Fa Zheng to form an alliance with Liu Bei after Zhang Song convinced him to do so. Liu Bei then led his men to Yi Province under the pretence of helping Liu Zhang conquer Hanzhong Commandery.

The campaign

Takeover of Jiameng
In 211, Liu Bei led an expedition force of tens of thousands of soldiers into Yi Province after leaving behind Zhuge Liang, Guan Yu, Zhang Fei and Zhao Yun to guard Jing Province. When Liu Bei entered Yi province, it was as if he was returning home. When he arrived at Fu County (涪縣; in present-day Fuling District, Chongqing) Liu Zhang led 30 000 soldiers into flambloyant display to welcome Liu Bei warmly; it was the occasion of a great meeting where they feasted for more than 100 days. Liu Zhang provided Liu Bei with more provisions and equipment for his army before they parted ways.

During this meeting; Fa Zheng told Liu Bei that Zhang Song along with Pang Tong wanted to use this opportunity to capture Liu Zhang and force him to hand over Yi Province to Liu Bei however Liu Bei didn't follow this plan because he felt that the plan was too hasty and that he should first win the hearts of the people of Yi province. Many of Liu Zhang's retainers protested against his decision to invite Liu Bei into the Yi province. Among them were Liu Ba and Huang Quan with Wang Lei (王累) committing suicide. Yan Yan famously remarked that Liu Zhang's decision was the equivalent of setting a tiger free to defend himself.

Liu Bei's army totalled more than 30,000 soldiers, all well equipped along with many supplies. They headed to Jiameng Pass (southwest of present-day Guangyuan, Sichuan) at the border between Liu Zhang and Zhang Lu's territories. However, instead of engaging Zhang Lu, Liu Bei halted his advance and focused on building up connections and gaining influence around the area in preparation for his takeover of Yi Province. Since he was kind and virtuous, many among the masses soon joined him. Among them was an eccentric man named Peng Yang (Han dynasty), he quickly became friend with Pang Tong and under his recommendation along with Fa Zheng's support joined Liu Bei's staff; he revealed himself a highly talented military instructor and became even more favoured by Liu Bei.

Next year in 212, Liu Bei send a letter to Liu Zhang where he told him that he needed more troops to divert Cao Cao's attention away from the east (where Sun Quan was under attack and asked for his help) and support Guan Yu against Yue Jin in Jing Province; he also mentioned that Zhang Lu was only looking to preserve his state and wouldn't engage into aggressive actions. Therefore, he requested for another 10,000 soldiers and additional provisions to aid in the defense of Jing Province. Liu Zhang gave him 40% of the troops and half of the others he asked for. When he saw that Liu Zhang didn't fulfill his demands, Liu Bei rallied his men and asked them how Liu Zhang could expect them to risk their lives for him when he accumulated wealth while being picky about the distribution of their reward.

When Fa Zheng, Zhang Song and Meng Da heard that there were discussion about Liu Bei leaving to defend Jing province, they pressed Liu Bei to stay into Yi province. Soon, Zhang Su (張肅), Zhang Song's brother, discovered his brother's secret communications with Liu Bei, feared that he would be victim if it failed and reported the issue to Liu Zhang. Liu Zhang was furious and stunned when he heard that Zhang Song had been helping Liu Bei to plot against him; he executed Zhang Song and ordered his military officers guarding the passes to Chengdu to keep secret his knowledge of Liu Bei's intention.

When Wei officials heard about the starting conflict between Liu Bei and Liu Zhang, there were discussions about who would overcome the other. Zhao Jian (趙戩) believed that Liu Bei didn't have the talent to accomplish such a task glossing over his past failures and highlighting the Yi province natural defences making it easy to defend and a arduous mission to conquer it. However Fu Gan (傅幹) argued that: "Liu Bei is benevolent and tolerant and his men are willing to give their lives in his service. Zhuge Liang is a perspicacious administrator who quickly grasps the changing situations. He is honorable, talented in planning and work as his chancellor. Zhang Fei and Guan Yu are brave and also possess righteousness. Both of them are known as warriors who are a match for ten thousand men (萬人敵) and are his commanders. These three men are heroes. Knowing of Liu Bei's awareness along with those three heroes assisting him. How he could not succeed?"

Early Success
However from secret communications, Liu Bei still heard about what happened to Zhang Song. Fa Zheng and Meng Da found a way to defect to Liu Bei's side before Yang Huai and Gao Pei, Liu Zhang's subordinates guarding Boshui Pass, knew about Liu Bei's true motive. Now, there was no other choice than to conquer Yi Province. Pang Tong outlined three plans for Liu Bei to choose from: The first was to advance swiftly to seize Chengdu, the capital of Yi Province, from Liu Zhang. The second was to take command of Liu Zhang's armies in the north and then move to capture Chengdu. The third one was to return to Baidicheng to await further action.

Liu Bei chose the second option and lured Yang Huai and Gao Pei into a trap and executed them under the pretense of behaving disrespectfully towards him. Wei Yan at this time, just began to serve under Liu Bei and was appointed as a bodyguard in his retinue; he made numerous achievements in several battles. When they learned of Liu Bei's attack, Zheng Du (鄭度) suggested to Liu Zhang a scorched earth policy by forcing the civilians of Baxi (巴西) and Zitong (梓潼) commanderies to relocate elsewhere and destroy all the suppliers depots in the commanderies. His basic for his plan was that Liu Bei's army was low on supplies and composed of new recruits who may not be loyal to him (this statement was proven truth when Lu Dai reported that many of Liu Bei's men deserted). Following this strategy along with a solid defence into the fortress while refusing any engagement in open battles would force Liu Bei to retreat and allow Liu Zhang to launch a counter attack. Liu Bei felt greatly disturbed when he learned about their plan however Fa Zheng reassured him that Liu Zhang would never follow this plan. Indeed he was proven right as Liu Zhang refused to use his plan and told his subordinates: "I have heard of fighting the enemy to save the people; not of disrupting the people to avoid the enemy." Furthermore he removed Zheng Du from office.

Finally, Liu Bei had Huang Zhong and Zhuo Ying (卓應) lead his soldiers against Liu Zhang. During this campaign, Huang Zhong would show great martial skills and was always the first to break the ennemy's formations. When he entered the different passes; he took the commanders as hostage along with their family, wives and children. Then, he took command of their troops, led his army along with Huang Zhong and Zhuo Ying to attack Fu County (涪縣; present-day Mianyang, Sichuan) and occupied the city.

Following those success, Liu Bei organized a banquet where he expressed his great joy having conquered all the passes. He said to Pang Tong that today is an auspicious day. However Pang Tong answered that celebrating warfare isn't what a benevolent man should do. Liu Bei was angry at his response and told him that he should leave. Liu Bei came to regret his actions and asked for Pang Tong to rejoin him. Pang Tong then drank and eat as before, when Liu Bei asked him who was in the wrong previously, he answered both of them. Liu Bei greatly laughed and feasted as before.

In the spring of 213, Liu Zhang sent Liu Gui (劉璝), Leng Bao (冷苞), Zhang Ren, Deng Xian (鄧賢), Wu Yi along with other officers to stop him at Fu. However all of them were defeated and had to retreat to Mianzhu. They were either killed or captured by Liu Bei's forces.  Despite being the most trusted vassal of Liu Zhang, Wu Yi soon changed allegiance.  Li Yan and Fei Guan were  also sent to help them at Mianzhu, but they surrendered to Liu Bei as well. With each victories, Liu Bei's army became stronger therefore he could dispatch commanders to pacify the other commanderies. After he conquered Mianzhu, Ma Liang's brother Ma Su who accompanied him was left in charge to act as his Prefect (令).

While Liu Bei led his army deeper into Yi province, Huo Jun was left in charge of the defence of Jiameng pass; a strategic point between Liu Zhang and Zhang Lu's territories. Zhang Lu wanted to use this opportunity to conquer Jiameng and had Yang Bo (楊帛) sent to deceive Huo Jun into opening the gate however Huo Jun saw through this and told him that they could take his head; never the fortress. Yang Bo could only withdrew his troops. After this, Liu Zhang's generals Fu Jin (扶禁), Xiang Cun (向存) and others led an army of more than 10 000 soldiers and attacked his position. Even if he only disposed of just a few hundred men; Huo Jun stalwart defence allowed him to resist their assault. After a siege that lasted one year, discipline within Liu Zhang's army was low. Huo Jun used this opportunity and selected his best soldiers to lead a sortie; he inflicted them a heavy defeat beheading Xiang Cun during the battle.

Defence of Luo County
Liu Zhang's eldest son, Liu Xun (劉循), took command of the remnants and retreated to Luo County (雒縣; north of present-day Guanghan, Sichuan) to join forces with Zhang Ren. Zhang Ren, attempted to break the siege by leading his men onto the Wild Goose Bridge and charging Liu Bei's forces, but he was defeated and captured. His loyalty and bravery were well known, so Liu Bei ordered his army to force the captive into submission. However, Zhang Ren said, "A loyal subject will never serve two masters!" Liu Bei lamented his determination and had him executed. While they besieged Luo county, Fa Zheng wrote to Liu Zhang a letter to convince him to surrender however it Liu Zhang ignored it. Liu Bei ordered his troops to surround Luo County and sent his adviser Pang Tong to lead a major assault on the castle. However, the defenders fought back with projectiles and Pang Tong was killed by a stray arrow.

Thus following Pang Tong's death, the siege became a prolonged one that lasted nearly a year. During this time, Lu Dai met Liu Bei who reported to Sun Quan that his army was in disarray and since they were stuck into a lasting siege inside an hostile territory many of his soldiers  also deserted. Lu Dai himself believed Liu Bei would fall to conquer Yi province against Wu Fan's opinion, another Wu official.

Such a situation forced Liu Bei to call forth reinforcements from Jing Province. Zhang Fei led an army from Jing Province to attack Jiangzhou (in present-day Chongqing), where he defeated Zhao Zan (趙筰) the Administrator of Ba Commandery who tried to stopped their advance and captured an enemy officer, Yan Yan. Facing Zhang Fei's insults, Yan Yan condemned him for invading Yi Province. Yan Yan was originally ordered to be executed by the angry Zhang Fei, but his fearlessness of death impressed Zhang, who pardoned the captive's life. Following the Dian River (垫江), Zhang Fei broke through a thin defence line, guarded by an enemy major, and rendezvoused with Liu Bei. Zhang Fei also defeated another army along the way sent by Liu Zhang and led by Zhang Yi to intercept Liu Bei's reinforcement at Deyang; thereafter, he could lead his army to Chengdu. During this campaign, Liu Bei's adopted son; Liu Feng followed the reinforcement army. He was just more than 20 but he impressed many with his martial skills and extraordinary strength. Zhao Yun and Zhuge Liang also conquered the surrounding counties and commanderies in the area before their arrival from another route.

Fall of Chengdu
After a siege of near one year; Luo County finally fell. Liu Bei then surrounded Chengdu with the other armies Ma Chao, a former Liang Province warlord and a vassal of Zhang Lu was hated by Zhang Lu's subordinate Yang Bai (楊柏) along with others who were jealous of his ability and wanted to harm him therefore Ma Chao wanted to use this opportunity to join Liu Bei. Liu Bei was pleased to hear this and exclaimed "Yi province is mine." He had Li Hui that recently joined him when he was at Mianzhu welcome Ma Chao and provided him soldiers and supplies to besiege the city. Upon seeing Ma Chao's army to the north of Chengdu, the citizens inside the city were terrified and within 10 days following his arrival, Liu Zhang promptly surrender. Moreover, the morale of Liu Zhang's army was at an all-time low and only a few of his generals such as Huang Quan wouldn't yield to Liu Bei and keep their defenses intact.

After a siege that lasted several weeks, Liu Bei decided to send his longtime adviser, Jian Yong, whom Liu Zhang was already fond of before the war broke out, to speak to Liu Zhang. Jian Yong managed to convince Liu Zhang to surrender. Thus, Liu Zhang opened Chengdu's gates and surrendered to Liu Bei; at this time the city still possessed 30 000 soldiers along with enough supplies for a year; many  among the officials and people wanted to fight to death however Liu Zhang refused stating that he didn't want to see further bloodshed; everyone inside the city wept for his sacrifice. Liu Bei then succeeded Liu Zhang as Governor of Yi Province, and he conferred on the latter the seal and tassel of General of Vehement Might (奮威將軍) before expatriating him and Liu Chan to Gong'an County in Jing province.

Since the Yi Province was prosperous, Liu Bei was able to start a great banquet. He used the gold and silver recently won to reward his soldiers and commanders; moreover he gave grain and silk to the common people. After he assumed the position of Governor of Yi Province, he promoted his followers, new and old to higher ranks; even those recently employed by Liu Zhang such as Dong He, Huang Quan and Li Yan or related to him by marriage such as Fei Guan and Wu Yi. All of them were put into position of power to make use of their talent. Among the elite with talent; there were none who did not compete for Liu Bei's attention. Then, he married Wu Yi's sister in an attempt to solidify his control on the newly conquered domain. Moreover a new code of law was applied to Yi Province called the Shu Ke (蜀科) formulated by Liu Bei's followers, Zhuge Liang and Yi Ji along with recently retainers of Liu Zhang; Fa Zheng, Li Yan and Liu Ba. According to Zhuge Liang's biography; although the new code of law was strict nobody complained because he was fair.

Aftermath
Upon hearing Liu Bei had taken Yi Province, Sun Quan sent envoys to ask him for the return of the commanderies in Jing Province, but Liu Bei said: "Jing Province will be returned after I take Liang Province." Sun Quan was furious when his envoy reported Liu Bei's words, and he sent Lü Meng and Ling Tong with another four officers to retake southern Jing Province. After Lü Meng and his colleagues captured three commanderies, Liu Bei returned to Gong'an County and prepared to seize back the three commanderies by force. However, he eventually arrived at a border treaty with Sun Quan when he heard Cao Cao was planning to attack Hanzhong Commandery.

Order of battle

Liu Bei forces
Liu Bei, commander
Fa Zheng, advisor, defected over from Liu Zhang's side prior to battle 
Meng Da, general, defected over from Liu Zhang's side prior to battle
 Pang Tong, director general until 214
Peng Yang, advisor
Ma Su, advisor
Liu Feng, Lt. general
Huang Zhong, general
 Zhuo Ying (卓膺), general
Wei Yan, Lt. general
Huo Jun, general
Jian Yong, advisor, diplomat 
Zhang Cun, advisor
Xi Zhen, advisor
Deng Fang, general
Zhang Fei, general
Zong Yu, served in Zhang Fei's army
Zhuge Liang, director general after 214
Zhao Yun, general 
Fu Kuang, served in Liu Bei's army
Li Hui, advisor, diplomat defected over from Liu Zhang's side to Liu Bei
Ma Chao, general defected over from Zhang Lu's side to Liu Bei

Liu Zhang forces
 Liu Zhang
Wang Lei (王累), committed suicide to warn Liu Zhang against inviting Liu Bei into Yi Province
 Zhang Song executed by Liu Zhang; when he learned his secret communications with Liu Bei
 Zhang Ren
 Wu Lan (吳蘭)
 Lei Tong (雷銅)
 Liu Xun (劉循)
 Pang Xi
 Yang Huai (楊懷)
 Gao Pei (高沛)
 Liu Gui (劉璝)
 Leng Bao (冷苞)
 Xiang Cun
 Fu Jin (扶禁)
 Deng Xian (鄧賢)
 Wu Yi
 Li Yan
 Fei Guan
 Zhang Yi
 Zhang Yi
  Yan Yan
 Huang Quan

In popular culture
The campaign is featured as one of the playable stages in Koei's video game series Dynasty Warriors. In the game, all the battles in the campaign were aptly summed up in one single battle, called the "Battle of Chengdu", although technically, there was no battle fought at Chengdu at all in the campaign. In 3 and 4, Liu Zhang's surrender is optional and often a special requirement for certain unlockable items. The concept was removed in 5 and Liu Zhang surrenders immediately after his defeat. In 6, the battle is renamed to "Pacification of Chengdu" and the geographical design of the stage has changed but the events remain almost the same. In 7, the campaign is split into two battles with the Battle of Luo Castle and battle of Chengdu. Battle of Luo Castle has Liu Xun as commander of Liu Zhang's forces and Pang Tong as commander of Liu Bei's forces. The battle serves as Pang's only appearance in Story Mode. The Battle of Chengdu follows Lou Castle with Zhuge Liang as commander after Pang's death.

Notes

References

 Chen, Shou. Records of the Three Kingdoms (Sanguozhi).
 Chang Qu (4th century). Chronicles of Huayang (Huayang Guo Zhi).
 Pei, Songzhi. Annotations to Records of the Three Kingdoms (Sanguozhi zhu).
 

Campaigns of the Han dynasty
Rebellions during the end of the Han dynasty
210s conflicts